Manilkara pleeana, the zapote de costa, is a species of plant in the family Sapotaceae. It is endemic to Puerto Rico.

References

pleeana
Plants described in 1891
Vulnerable plants
Endemic flora of Puerto Rico
Taxonomy articles created by Polbot
Taxa named by Jean Baptiste Louis Pierre
Taxa named by Henri Ernest Baillon
Taxa named by Arthur Cronquist